A synthetic substance or synthetic compound refers to a substance that is man-made by synthesis, rather than being produced by nature. It also refers to a substance or compound formed under human control by any chemical reaction, either by chemical synthesis (chemosyntesis) or by biosynthesis.

 Chemical synthesis